Umurbey can refer to:

 Umurbey Dam
 Umurbey, Enez
 Umurbey, Gemlik